Poet on a Business Trip is a 2015 Chinese documentary film directed, written and cinematographed by Ju Anqi. Originally shot in colour but edited to black-and-white, it follows a poet as he travels through Xinjiang Uygur Autonomous Region to write a series of 16 poems.

It made its world premiere at the 2015 International Film Festival Rotterdam and its Asian premiere at the 16th Jeonju International Film Festival, winning the NETPAC Award and the International Competition's grand prize, respectively.

Synopsis

Production
In 2002, director Ju and Chinese actor-poet Shu (who played the title character) took a train from Beijing to Xinjiang Uygur Autonomous Region, 4000 kilometers away. In inhospitable and impoverished conditions, the two began to record their adventure on a 40-day journey across the whole of Xinjiang. A decade-long dispute between Ju and Shu put the project on hold. It was not until 2013 that Ju started editing the material and finished it in 2014.

Reception
Poet on a Business Trip was lauded by the Jeonju International Film Festival's International Competition jury member as "simple, curious, artful and ultimately very moving."

Awards and nominations

References

External links
 

2015 films
Chinese documentary films
2010s Mandarin-language films